Gianpaolo Rosmino (2 July 1888 – 20 July 1982) was an Italian actor and film director. Rosmino enjoyed a lengthy screen career. After making his debut in the silent era in 1913 he appeared in more than 80 films and television series up to 1965. He played a prominent role in the 1913 silent Love Everlasting, one of the two most famous Italian early silent films. He is sometimes credited as Gian Paolo Rosmino.

He played the title role in the 1935 film Don Bosco.

Selected filmography

Actor
Love Everlasting (1913)
Don Bosco (1935)
Aldebaran (1935)
 The Dance of Time (1936)
 Marcella (1937)
Guest for One Night (1939)
Rita of Cascia (1943)
 The Flame That Will Not Die (1949)
The Young Caruso (1951)
 Frine, Courtesan of Orient (1953)
 Mata Hari's Daughter (1954)
Hercules (1958)
Afrodite, dea dell'amore (1958)
The Giant of Marathon (1959)
Hercules Unchained (1959)
Fury of Achilles (1962)
The Revenge of Spartacus (1965)

References

External links

Bibliography
Moliterno, Gino. Historical Dictionary of Italian Cinema. Scarecrow Press, 2008.

1888 births
1992 deaths
Italian film directors
Italian male film actors
Italian male silent film actors
Italian male stage actors
Actors from Turin
20th-century Italian male actors
Film people from Turin